Mikami Taku (22 March 1905 – 25 October 1971) was a lieutenant in the Imperial Japanese Navy, who participated in the May 15 Incident in which Prime Minister Inukai Tsuyoshi was assassinated.

He composed the "Ode of Showa Restoration" as an anthem for the Young Officers Movement.

Biography 
Mikami Taku was born in Saga, Saga Prefecture. He graduated Naval Academy, Etajima in 1926. In 1930, He wrote the lyrics to Seinen Nihon no Uta (Ode of Showa Restoration).

In May 1932, he attacked Prime Minister Tsuyoshi Inukai in the May 15 Incident. In 1933, he was sentenced to death for mutiny at a naval court-martial in Yokosuka, but was sentenced to 15 years' imprisonment for the same offence and served time in Kosuge Prison (Tokyo Detention House).

In 1938, he was released on parole after four years and nine months, after a series of commutations due to pardons for Kigensetsu anniversary and the 50th anniversary of Meiji Constitution's promulgation.

In March 1941, he founded Hishirogi Juku (ひもろぎ塾) with Nisshō Inoue, Yoshitaka Yotsumoto, Goro Hishinuma and others, and served as the brain behind former Prime Minister Fumimaro Konoe.

1971年、he passed away in Izu, Shizuoka.

References

1905 births
1971 deaths
Imperial Japanese Navy officers